Plaza Las Américas is a shopping mall in Hato Rey, San Juan, Puerto Rico, located at the intersection of Routes 18 and 22. "Plaza", as it is known to many Puerto Ricans, was the first indoor shopping mall built in Puerto Rico. It is the largest shopping mall in the Caribbean and the second largest in Latin America. Anchor stores are JCPenney, Macy's, Sears, Sears Brand Central, Forever 21, Old Navy, Caribbean Cinemas and Marshalls. There is also a Kmart store near the mall.

History
In 1918, siblings Jerónimo, Rosa, Gerardo, and Jaime Fonalledas acquired  of land previously known as "Las Monjas". This land was property of Don Pablo Ubarri Capetillo, the Count of Santurce. By 1920, little by little cane harvesting was eliminated with the intention of using the land for the creation of a milk company, eventually known as "Vaquería Tres Monjitas". In 1950, the metropolitan area of San Juan was growing rapidly. The planning board began to build the project and ordered the development of the lands. It is then that the Fonalledas brothers came up with the idea of establishing a regional shopping center in the "Las Monjas" property. The planning board included a space of 15 acres of land for a shopping center in its development plan. In 1962, the plans for the construction of a shopping center and the negotiations with tenants began. In April 1967, construction of Plaza Las Américas began under the direction of engineer Peter Jacobson. On September 3, 1968, Plaza Las Américas held its grand opening. It was the first enclosed shopping center in Puerto Rico and the largest in Latin America at the time. The project was inaugurated with a total of 79 establishments, a twin cinema and parking for 4,000 vehicles. One hundred percent of the space was rented and nearly 2,000 people were employed in the new mall. The primary anchor store was a three-level (261,500 square foot) J. C. Penney. It was the chain's first location outside the fifty states and its largest operation between 1968 and 1971. The mall also housed two San Juan-based department stores as its second and third anchors: a two-level (76,500 square foot) González Padín and (22,000 square foot) Velasco. Inline stores included Martha Washington Ice Cream, Gordon's Jewelers, Florsheim Shoes, La Esquina Famosa (men's clothing), Bakers (shoes), Zales, Clubman, Marianne Shops, Singer Sewing Center, Lerner Shops, Thom McAn, La Favorita and First Federal Savings Bank, along with an F. W. Woolworth Company, Farmacias González (pharmacy), La Cosa (curios), La Tienda Sin Nombre (shoes), Benny's Toys, Pueblo Supermarket, a barbershop, a travel agency and a full-sized hardware store. A small section had a second floor where medical and business offices were accessible. The following year, the architectural design of Plaza Las Américas won the URBE Award for Best Commercial Architecture

In 1979, the first expansion of the shopping center was  completed. Fifty-five new stores were added in a three-level North Wing. This was anchored by a 3-level (329,000 square foot) Sears. The "Terraza de Plaza", the first food court to be established in the island, comprises the third level of the addition, along with three additional movie theater halls, nicknamed Plaza III, Plaza IV, and Plaza V. In 1992, the new development plan for the second great expansion of Plaza Las Americas is published. In 1994, the expansion of Plaza Las Américas and also the remodeling of "La Terraza" were completed. The number of restaurants was increased from 19 to 24 and the movie theater halls from 5 to 10. The construction of the "Torre de Plaza" is finished at a cost of $15 million. The Tower added  of profitable space to the shopping center. In 1996, Plaza Las Americas announced its largest expansion and remodeling at a cost of more than $246 million. In 1997, the advertising campaign of Plaza Las Américas ("Menos mal que está Plaza") is awarded the Maxi Award which is granted by the International Council of Shopping Centers (ICSC). The following year, the first phase of the center's three-year-long expansion and renovation is dedicated. This consists of a newly built four-level (350,000 square foot) J.C. Penney, replacing the three-level store that had opened at the mall in 1968. The new Penney's at Plaza Las Américas is the chain's largest store. The original location was subdivided into new retail spaces. In 1999, the overpass bridge on the De Diego Expressway was inaugurated, offering better access to the shopping center.

In 2000, the remodeling and expansion of the shopping center was completed, offering a new facade occupied by over 300 stores. A three-level (255,000 square foot) Macy’s opened as the third anchor of the shopping center on October 25, making it the chain's first location outside the fifty states. Local movie theater chain Caribbean Cinemas opened a thirteen-screen movie theater in 2005 and is the busiest and highest-grossing of the entire chain. A concept of "public" art was created in the shopping center, which includes pieces by local artists. In 2012, Plaza Las Américas invested $12 million in remodeling the mall's north entrance facade. The remodeling work began on May 23, 2012, and was completed by mid November 2012, just before the holiday season. In addition, between July–August 2012, expansion began on the multistory parking, located in the southern area of the mall. The expansion extended the five floors of multistory to add over 300 parking spaces. All parking areas of the mall were also repaved while new landscape gardens designs where developed in front of the main entrance. On August 28, 2013, Plaza opened the first ever Cheesecake Factory in Puerto Rico. Sports Authority opened in mid-2014, along with an expansion in parking. It closed in 2016 after the company declared bankruptcy and was replaced by Marshalls in February 2018, according to El Nuevo Dia. Also, in early 2018, a Red Lobster restaurant opened.

In September 2018, the mall celebrated its 50th anniversary. In December 2019, it was announced that Cuba Libre Restaurant and Rum Bar will be constructed in the mall, originally set to open by January 2021, but due to economic loss caused by the COVID-19 pandemic, this project’s current state is unknown

In March 2020, the mall closed until further notice due to the COVID-19 pandemic. Following the announcement of a new executive order on May 21, the mall reopened on June 1 with security measures, including new hours, mandatory face masks and social distancing. Reservations were now required to visit the mall and were originally limited to 2 people. On June 9, reservations were changed to allow up to 4 people. On July 1, it was announced that the reservations would no longer be required to visit the mall starting July 3, though face masks were still a mandatory requirement. As of January 2022, masks are still mandatory for everyone regardless of vaccination status 

The Toys "R" Us chain said it would open its stores within the Macy's Department Store and that its flagship store will be at Plaza Las Américas, in 2022.

In November 2021, it was reported that Macys Backstage will be taking over the second floor of the former Borders Books and it would be opening in time for the 2021 holiday season.

On October 15, 2022, it was announced that the Kmart store, the last in Puerto Rico, would be closed by the end of that month.

Notable attributes

 It is the largest shopping center in the Caribbean.
 Plaza's Macy's was the first one to open in the Caribbean.
 Plaza's Chili's is the highest grossing in the world.
 It has the world's largest Romano's Macaroni Grill restaurant.
 It houses the first Cheesecake Factory restaurant in the Caribbean, officially opened on August 28, 2013.
Sports Authority became the sixth largest anchor store, first opened up in mid-2014, followed by an expansion of parking spaces. It closed in 2016 after the company declared bankruptcy and was replaced by a Marshalls in February 2018.
Dave & Buster's opened at the mall on January 30, 2023, right across from Olive Garden on the third floor.
Notable former stores at Plaza Las Américas are Kmart, Pottery Barn, KB Toys, RadioShack, GameStop, Toys R Us, Borders Bookstores and GAP.

Current anchor stores
 JCPenney
 Macy's
 Sears
 Sears Brand Central & Home Improvement
 Dave & Buster's
 Forever 21 (Third Level, at the food court)
 Zara
 Old Navy
 Walgreens
 Caribbean Cinemas (Second Level)
 Marshalls (No indoor connection to the mall)
 Genesis

Current outparcel stores
 OfficeMax
 Rooms To Go
 Supermercados Pueblo
 Burlington
 Ashley HomeStore
 Best Buy

Former stores
 Sears Auto Center - closed 2022
 Blockbuster Video - closed late 2011
Disney Store - closed 2021
 Borders Bookstores - closed 2011
 Sports Authority - closed 2016
 Toys R Us - closed 2018
 Kmart - closed on October 15th, 2022
 Godiva - closed 2021
 González Padín - closed circa 1994
 Velasco - closed 1970’s
 On The Pier Arcade (previously Namco Time Out) - Arcade parlor
 Western Auto - closed 2004

Gallery

See also

 Jaime Fonalledas
 Plaza Carolina
 Plaza del Caribe
 The Mall of San Juan
 Plaza del Carmen Mall
 Las Catalinas Mall

References

External links

 Plaza Las Américas Official Homepage

Shopping malls in Puerto Rico
Buildings and structures in San Juan, Puerto Rico
Shopping malls established in 1968
Tourist attractions in San Juan, Puerto Rico
Hato Rey, Puerto Rico
1968 establishments in Puerto Rico
Economic history of Puerto Rico